The Little Dry River is a  tributary of the North Fork Shenandoah River in the U.S. state of Virginia. It rises in Rockingham County just east of the Virginia-West Virginia border near the crest of Shenandoah Mountain and flows east, joining the North Fork just west of the village of Fulks Run.

See also
List of rivers of Virginia

References

USGS Hydrologic Unit Map - State of Virginia (1974)

Rivers of Virginia
Tributaries of the Shenandoah River
Rivers of Rockingham County, Virginia